School choice in the U.S. state of Florida is a suite of state programs that allow families to use public resources to receive education outside of their neighborhood public school. Florida's Tax Credit Scholarship (FTC) program is the largest of its kind in the U.S., with more students than all but the state's largest school districts.

Florida's public school options include magnet schools, academies, charter schools and other programs. Private schools provide additional options.

Private school scholarships are funded by Step Up For Students and AAA Scholarship Foundation.

Choice programs 

 Home schooling allows students to study at home.

 McKay scholarships help students with disabilities. Students can attend a private school or another public school.

 Gardiner scholarships help students attend a private school who have specific disabilities and an Individualized Education Plan (IEP). The award can also be used to purchase curriculum, materials and other services, and to offset home schooling costs.

 Hope tax credit scholarships help students who report bullying or harassment. Such students can opt for private school, or access free transport to a public school. Funds come from vehicle sales taxes that are designated by payers to support the program.

 Opportunity scholarships serve students who attend public schools graded "D" or "F". Students can enroll in another public school with a higher grade and receive free transport. Districts identify schools that are eligible to receive such students, limited by capacity and transport. Fewer than 10% of students generally participate.

 Virtual schooling provides distance learning and is offered by public school districts, Florida Virtual School and some charter schools.

 Charter schools are public schools that operate independently of school districts.

 Open enrollment allows students to enroll in any school within their district. In some cases students can enroll across district boundaries, although in-district students have priority. Open enrollment is available to all students.

 Family Empowerment scholarships make FTC available to more students. They are funded through the Florida Education Finance Program. Eligible students attend public school, live in families with incomes up to 300% of the poverty line, those eligible for the food assistance program, Temporary Assistance to Needy Families or Food Distribution on Indian Reservations and those in foster care or in out-of-home care.

History 

In 2006 the Florida Supreme Court ruled the Opportunity Scholarship Program violated the Florida Constitution because the private schools it supported were not part of the "uniform, efficient, safe, secure, and high quality system of free public schools" that the Constitution required. Thereafter private schools were dropped from the program. Enrollment declined from a peak of 4,424 (2011) to 3,074 (2017). African-American and Hispanic students made up the vast majority of enrollees.

The McKay scholarship program began in 2000. During the 2017-18 academic year 31,044 students enrolled in 1,482 schools.

The Gardiner scholarship program began in 2016 and had grown to serve 10,000 by the end of 2018.

The Hope scholarship program began in October, 2018. In 2017-18, nearly two thirds of the recipients were on the autism spectrum and used the money to attend a private school. In 2019, 271 students participated.

Home schooling had 89,817 enrollees in 2017-18, increasing about 2,400 from the prior year. The option is most popular in Duval, Hillsborough and Orange counties.

In 2016 the state made it easier for students to attend schools across district boundaries. 

In 2017-18, private school support reached $641 million, aiding 108,098 children in 1,818 schools. In 2019 it reached nearly 4% of the K-12 population of nearly 2.78 million students.

The number of charter schools in Florida reached over 658 in 2018-19, serving 313,000 students.

Family Empowerment scholarships were created in 2019. The program was capped at 18,000 students. It eliminated a waiting list of 13,000 families seeking a FTC. Vouchers run between $6,775 and $7,250. 87% of recipients have household incomes below 185% of the federal poverty level. The limit is 300%. Most are Black or Hispanic. In 2020 the cap was increased to 28,000. If demand is insufficient, the income limit will be increased by 25%. Teachers unions opposed the program.

School choice 
As of 2019, 25 states, Washington, DC and Puerto Rico operated voucher or scholarship programs. Many of these programs targeted specific populations such as disabled or low-income students.

A controversy surrounds the impact of these programs on public schools that lose students. Among the hypotheses that have been advanced are that those schools are forced to improve to compete for students, that the loss of resources from lower enrollment hurts them or that choice-induced changes to their student bodies disadvantages those who remained. Another question surrounds the time path of the impacts, whether they come suddenly or grow as the school choice program evolves.

In the US various studies showed small but positive short-term effects of the introduction of private school voucher programs on public school students’ test scores. Longer-term studies of Milwaukee and North Carolina students showed modestly positive effects. In NC, competition increased over two years, totaling roughly 25%.

A study of scale up of Massachusetts charter programs reported small positive effects on test scores.

Results 
A 2020 study of the Florida Tax Credit Scholarship Program reviewed child-level data that matched birth records to school records, employing student fixed effects to analyze cognitive and behavioral outcomes and heterogeneity. It used five separate measures of voucher competition over time including educational (test scores) and behavioral (absenteeism and suspensions) metrics.

The study reported that students in public schools more exposed to private school choice experienced increasing benefits with program scale. These included lower rates of suspensions and absences and higher standardized test scores in reading and in math. These results were not uniform: the students most positively affected were those with lower family incomes and lower maternal education levels. Statistically significant but smaller gains came for higher-SES students. The results were robust changes in public school student composition and resources.

A 2019 study of the impact of choice programs on college enrollment reported that 57% of FTC students compared with 51 percent of non-FTC students enrolled and were more likely to attend college full time. FTC students were somewhat more likely to earn bachelor's degrees, but no more like to earn an Associate's degree. The program’s impact on both measures increased with the number of years of FTC participation.

See also 

 School choice

References 

Charter schools in Florida
Private schools in Florida
Education policy in the United States